The Voice Kids is a Polish reality music talent show for aspiring singers aged 7 to 14, airing on TVP 2. The fourth season premiered on February 27, 2021. Tomson & Baron, Dawid Kwiatkowski and Cleo returned as the coaches. Tomasz Kammel will return as host, with Ida Nowakowska-Herndon. Sara Egwu-James won the season, marking Tomson & Baron's first win.

Coaches

Teams 
 Colour key

Blind auditions 
Color key

Episode 1 (February 27, 2021)

Episode 2 (February 27, 2021)

Episode 3 (March 5, 2021)

Episode 4 (March 5, 2021) 

Aleksandra Brzuszkiewicz appeared earlier in the  first season of The Voice Kids, as a member of Tomson and Baron team. She completed the program at the stage of battles. In this edition, she chose Dawid Kwiatkowski as her trainer.

Episode 5 (March 6, 2021)

Episode 6 (March 6, 2021)

Episode 7 (March 12, 2021)

Episode 8 (March 12, 2021)

Episode 9 (March 13, 2021)

Episode 10 (March 13, 2021) 

Krystian Gontarz appeared earlier in the  first season of The Voice Kids as a member of Tomson and Baron team. He completed the program at the stage of battles.

The Battle Rounds
Color key

Episode 11: Team Cleo (March 20, 2021) 
The Cleo's group performed "Alfabet świateł" at the start of the show.

Sing offs

Episode 12: Team Dawid (March 27, 2021) 
The Dawid's group performed "Duchy tych, co mieszkali tu" at the start of the show.

Alicja Górzyńska could not participate in the battles due to personal reasons. Dawid Kwiatkowski decided to promote Alicja and Aleksandra to the Sing-Off stage with permission of producers. Alicja Górzyńska was invited to participate Season 5 The Voice Kids.

Sing offs

Episode 13: Team Tomson & Baron (April 3, 2021) 
The Tomson & Baron's group performed "Ghostbusters" at the start of the show.

Sing offs

Episode 14 Finale 
Color key

Round 1  (April 10, 2021) 

Each contestant performed a duet with their judge.

Round 2  (April 17, 2021) 
Each contestant performed a cover and their original song.

Elimination chart 
Colour key
Artist's info

Result details

Teams
Color key
Artist's info

Results details

References 

The Voice of Poland